Ritual is a studio album by The Jazz Messengers featuring Art Blakey. Three years after being recorded, it was first released on the Pacific Jazz Records label as PJM-402, and reissued by them in 1962, with an Elmo Hope session, as Art Blakey & The Jazz Messengers/The Elmo Hope Quintet* Featuring Harold Land as PJ-33. It has been reissued on CD.

This later CD, however, features all the recordings from the original Ritual release, plus the Blakey album Once Upon a Groove, which featured two additional songs recorded in the same 1957 sessions, but not released for several decades (as Blue Note LT-1065). This album is highlighted by hard-swinging sounds from saxophonist Jackie McLean, who previously made his debut with Miles Davis in 1951, and trumpeter Bill Hardman, who played with Charles Mingus during the previous year earlier in 1956.

Track listing 
"Sam's Tune" (Sam Dockery) - 5:52
"Scotch Blues" (Duke Jordan) - 8:31
"Once Upon a Groove" (Owen Eugene Marshall) - 8:36
"Art Blakey's Comments on Ritual" (Art Blakey) - 1:55
"Ritual" (Art Blakey) - 9:59
"Touche" (Mal Waldron) - 6:16
"Wake Up!" (Lee Sears) - 5:04
"Little T." (Donald Byrd)- 8:46 from Once Upon a Groove
"Exhibit A" (Art Blakey, Lee Sears) - 6:44 from Once Upon a Groove

 Note: Among many re-issues and compilations, tracks 3, 4, 5, and 6 were re-issued in 1957 on Jazztone's Jazz Messages

Personnel 
Art Blakey Quintet
Art Blakey - Drums
Bill Hardman - Trumpet
Jackie McLean - Alto Sax
Sam Dockery - Piano
Spanky DeBrest - Bass

Production
George Avakian - Original Session Producer
Michael Cuscuna - Liner Notes
Ron McMaster - Digital Transfers
John Altoon - Cover Art
Richard Bock - Engineer

References 

1957 albums
Blue Note Records albums
Art Blakey albums
The Jazz Messengers albums
Instrumental albums
Pacific Jazz Records albums
Capitol Records albums
Albums produced by George Avakian
Albums produced by Michael Cuscuna